Stipa zalesskii is a grass found in Europe and Asia. It is an important grass in Eurasian steppe. Its culms are 30–75 cm long and the leaf-blades 20–35 cm long by 0.6–1 mm wide.

Synonyms
 Stipa canescens P.A.Smirn. ex Roshev.
 Stipa dobrogensis Prodán
 Stipa glabrata P.A.Smirn.
 Stipa iljinii Roshev.
 Stipa krascheninnikowii Roshev.
 Stipa maeotica Klokov & Osychnyuk
 Stipa maeotica Klokov & Ossycznjuk
 Stipa pennata subsp. zalesskii (Wilensky) Freitag
 Stipa rubens P.A.Smirn.
 Stipa rubentiformis P.A.Smirn.
 Stipa smirnovii Martinovský
 Stipa turcomanica P.A.Smirn.
 Stipa ucrainica P.A.Smirn.
 Stipa zalesskii subsp. canescens (P.A.Smirn.) Tzvelev
 Stipa zalesskii var. glabrata (P.A.Smirn.) Tzvelev
 Stipa zalesskii var. iljinii (Roshev.) Tzvelev
 Stipa zalesskii var. maeotica (Klokov) Tzvelev
 Stipa zalesskii var. rubens (P.A.Smirn.) Tzvelev
 Stipa zalesskii subsp. turcomanica (P.A.Smirn.) Tzvelev
 Stipa zalesskiisubsp. ucrainica (P.A.Smirn.) Tzvelev

References
 Repertorium Specierum Novarum Regni Vegetabilis 21: 232. 1925. (Repert. Spec. Nov. Regni Veg.)
 Fl. Kavkaza 1:67. 1928 (D. G. Wilensky, Dnevn. Vserossijsk. S'ezda Russk. Bot. 1:41. 1921, nom. nud.)
 The Plant List entry
 Encyclopedia of Life entry
 GBIF entry
 
 GrassBase entry
 Hortipedia entry
 NCBI Nucleotide database

zalesskii